Platon Mikhailovich Kerzhentsev, (real name Lebedev (Ле́бедев), pseudonym V. Kerzhentsev) (4 August 1881 – 2 June 1940) was a Soviet state and party official, revolutionary, diplomat, journalist, historian, playwright and arts theorist who was involved with the Proletkult movement. 

From 29 December 1930 until 23 March 1933, he served as Administrator of Affairs of the Council of People's Commissars, and was the second person to fill that post.

He was the first Soviet historian of Ireland and was considered the leading expert on Ireland in the Soviet Union.

Biography
Kerzhentsev was born in to the family of a doctor. His father, Mikhail Dimitrievich Lebedev, was a deputy in the State Duma. He studied at the Faculty of History and Philology of the Moscow University however was expelled from the university for being involved in underground revolutionary activity.

Kerzhentsev became a member of the Bolshevik faction of the Russian Social Democratic Labour Party in 1904 and emigrated in 1912. He gained experience of mass theatre in Europe and anglophone countries during a period of exile. He was influenced by Percy MacKaye, Richard Wagner and Alexandr Bogdanov. He was in New York City in 1916, living in the same boarding house as Padraic Colum. Returning to Russia in 1917, he was a leading figure in the Proletkult movement, and was the director of ROSTA, forerunner of the TASS news agency. He had articles published in Vestnik Teatra, the Journal of the Theatre Department of Narkompros based in Moscow. In 1921, when Proletkult was taken under party control, on Lenin's instructions, and its founder, Alexander Bogdanov was ousted, Kerzhentsev was appointed Ambassador in Sweden. He returned in 1923, and  criticised Bogdanov in Pravda where he focused on The Organizational Principles of a Uniform Economic Plan a text submitted to the First Conference on Scientific Organization of Labour (January 1921). In 1923–25, he ran an institute that studied labour organisation. He opposed piece work and other incentives which he believed would create a 'working class aristocracy. He was Soviet ambassador in Italy in 1925–26, and deputy head of the Central Statistical Administration, 1926–28.

In 1928, Kerzhentsev was appointed deputy head of Agitprop and head of the culture and science department of the VKP (b) Central Committee, and for the next ten years was a major figure in the administration and censorship of the arts. A champion of proletarian art, he took a particular dislike to the prominent Russian playwright, Mikhail Bulgakov.

In January 1929, he played a pivotal part in getting Bulgakov's fourth play, Flight, banned. He then wrote an article that appeared in Pravda on 7 February 1929, alleging that the Ukrainian people were being insulted by a play performed at the Moscow Arts Theatre, his obvious target being Bulgakov's first and best known play, The Day of the Turbins known to western audiences as The White Guard, set in Kiev, and attacked the People's Commissar for Enlightenment, Anatoli Lunacharsky for allowing it to be staged. The play was suppressed in March 1929, but later revived, because Stalin liked it.

Kerzhentsev was President of the All Union Radio Committee. In January 1936, he was appointed Chairman of the State Committee on the Arts, which meant that he was responsible for theatre, opera and music, as well as other art forms, during the campaign initiated by Stalin against Dmitri Shostakovich, who turned to Kerzhentsev for advice, and was told to write less complex music that the masses could understand. He resumed his campaign against Bulgakov, whose latest play, Moliere, the first two performances of which, in February 1935, had sold out. Kerzhentsev wrote to Stalin, alleging that the play was an allegory which drew a parallel between Molière's humiliating treatment by Louis XIV and the treatment of Soviet artists - which very likely was Bulgakov's intention. The play was immediately banned.

Kerzhentsev was dismissed in 1938, but survived the great purge without being arrested. He died of heart failure.

Publications

Books 
Tvorcheskii teatr (Creative Theatre), Various publishers, 1918–23 (5 editions)
Revolutsiayannaya Irlandiya (Revolutionary Ireland in English, 1918)
Stolitsa Anglii. Progulki po Londonu (The capital of England: London walks) Moscow:Gosudarstvennoe izdatel’stvo 1919
Life of Lenin (1939)

Articles 
'Proletkul't'—organizatsiia proletarskoi samodeiatel'nosti, Proletarskaia kul'tura, no. 1 (1918), pp. 7–8;
'Organizatsiia literaturnogo tvorchestva', Proletarskaia kul'tura, no. 5 (1918), pp. 23–26.
'Posle prazdnika' Iskusstvo, no.6 (1918): 3–5.
'Repertuar proletarskogo teatra', Iskusstvo, no. 1 [5] (1918), pp. 5–7.
Revoliutsiia i teatr, Moscow: Dennitsa, 1918.
'Kollektivnoe tcorchestvo v teatre', Proletarskaia kul'tura, no. 7–8 (1919), pp. 37–41.
'Mozhno li iskazhat' p'esy postanovkoi?' Vestnik teatra, no. 1 (1919), p. 2.
'O professionalizme', Gorn, no. 4 (1919), pp. 69–71.
'Peredelyvaite p'esy!', Vestnik teatra, no. 36 (1919), pp. 6–8.
Pervoe maia i mirovaia revoliutsiia, Tver: Tsentropechat', 1919.
'Rozn' iskusstva', Vestnik teatra, no. 19 (1919), p. 2.
'Burzhuaznoe nasledie', Vestnik teatra, no. 51 (1920), pp. 2–3.
'Teatral'nyi muzei', Vestnik teatra, no. 48 (1920), pp. 4–5.
'Pis'mo v redaktsiiu', Vestnik teatra, no. 53 (1920), p. 5.

See also

 Proletkult

Footnotes

External links
 

1881 births
1940 deaths
Russian revolutionaries
Old Bolsheviks
Russian Social Democratic Labour Party members
Russian communists
Russian literary critics
Soviet writers
Soviet historians
Ambassadors of the Soviet Union to Italy
Soviet literary critics
Pravda people
Soviet theatre critics
Ambassadors of the Soviet Union to Sweden
20th-century Russian journalists